Tempation is a 1935 film by Oscar Micheaux. The storyline depicts the corrupting influence of carnal desires. The National Museum of African American History and Culture has a lobby card for the film advertising "a great colored cast". Ethel Moses has her film debut in the film as a naive woman who models nude and struggles to fend off opportunistic men while becoming part of a criminal underworld The film made her a fully fledged star.

Cast
The film was directed by Oscar Micheaux and distributed by the Micheaux Film and Book Company.

Actors in the film include:

 Andrew S. Bishop
 Ethel Moses 
 Lorenzo Tucker 
 Vincente Minnelli
 Alfred "Slick" Chester
 Dorothy Van Engle

References

External links 

 

1935 films
Films directed by Oscar Micheaux
American crime films
1930s American films